The Culinary Workers Union, UNITE HERE Local 226 is a local union affiliated with UNITE HERE which operates in the Las Vegas metropolitan area of Nevada.

Members include a variety of occupations organized along craft lines working in restaurants, hotels and laundries, in the casinos in the Las Vegas metropolitan area and Reno, as well as Harry Reid International Airport and Valley Hospital Medical Center.  While most Culinary members work in casinos, the union does not represent dealers and other employees directly providing gaming services. The union also has a partnership with the Culinary Academy of Las Vegas, which Hattie Canty, the first African-American woman elected to be president of the Culinary Union, was instrumental in organizing. Local 165 of UNITE HERE represents bartenders in Las Vegas although the two locals negotiate contracts in tandem.

With 60,000 members, the Culinary is the largest union in the state of Nevada. The union tripled its membership between 1990 and 2020, even as labor union membership declined nationwide in the same time period. According to labor journalist Steven Greenhouse, it has "catapulted thousands of dishwashers, waiters, and hotel housekeepers into the middle class, even though those are poverty-level jobs in many other cities." Despite Nevada's status as a right to work state, around 97% of bargaining units choose to join the Culinary Union and pay dues. This has led The New Republic to call the Culinary Union "America's greatest modern labor success story." 

As a result of the COVID-19 pandemic and its negative impacts on the Nevada tourist industry, more than 98% of the union's members became unemployed in 2020. During the pandemic, the union provided 18 months of free health insurance to laid-off members and distributed over 475,000 baskets of food to hospitality workers' families in need. It also lobbied for Nevada's Senate Bill 4, which instituted COVID-19 workplace safety regulations for the state's hospitality industry, and Senate Bill 386, which guaranteed laid-off hospitality workers the right to be rehired into their old jobs when casinos and other businesses reopened.

Politics
The union is an influential supporter of Democratic politicians and causes in the state of Nevada. Jon Ralston has credited its voter education and turnout operations for Democrats' statewide, state legislative, and congressional victories in 2016, 2018, and 2020, and for maintaining many of these gains in 2022. According to The Nevada Independent, the union is "among the most singularly powerful political forces in Nevada" and is a "key cog in the [Reid] machine."

In January 2008, the union endorsed Illinois Senator Barack Obama over New York Senator Hillary Clinton during the 2008 Democratic caucuses.

In February 2016, the union declined to endorse either Clinton or Vermont Senator Bernie Sanders during the caucuses, and later endorsed Clinton when she became the Democratic presidential nominee. She lost the general election to Donald Trump on November 8, 2016, though she won Nevada.

Yvanna Cancela, the political director for the union, was appointed to the Nevada Senate in 2017, and later became chief of staff to Nevada governor Steve Sisolak.

In December 2018, Bea Duran, a grievance representative for the Culinary Workers, was appointed to the Nevada State Assembly.

In February 2020, the Union once again declined to endorse a candidate for that year's caucuses. Their decision came after it circulated a flyer among members criticizing Sanders and Massachusetts Senator Elizabeth Warren's support for single-payer healthcare, which it argued would leave members with worse benefits. Some union leaders reported receiving threats after the flyer was published. Despite this warning, a majority of the union's members caucusing at one casino in Nevada voted for Sanders.

Secretary-Treasurers
1954: Al Bramlet
1977: Ben Schmoutey
1981: Jeff McColl
1987: Jim Arnold
2002: D. Taylor
2012: Geoconda Argüello-Kline
2022: Ted Pappageorge

References

External links 
 
 Bartenders Local 165 Website

Economy of Nevada
Hospitality industry trade unions
Trade unions established in 1935
Trade unions in Nevada
UNITE HERE